The South China catshark (Apristurus sinensis) is a catshark of the family Scyliorhinidae, known only from the holotype, which was taken from the South China Sea at a depth of 537 m. Its length is 42 cm, but this measurement was taken from an immature specimen. The reproduction of the South China catshark is oviparous.

References

 

South China catshark
South China
Taxa named by Chu Yuan-Ting
Taxa named by Hu Ai-Sun
South China catshark